The Worcester Collegiate Hockey League was an intercollegiate athletic conference affiliated with the NCAA's College Division. The league was created in 1966 between 4 schools from around Worcester, Massachusetts as well as Nichols College, a few miles to the south.

History
In 1966 a few colleges in the Worcester, Massachusetts area began sponsoring ice hockey as a varsity sport. The schools immediately banded together to form the Worcester Collegiate Hockey League and included the already existing programs at Assumption College and Nichols College. After one season four of the members joined ECAC 2 as well but continued to hold their own conference tournament. Holy Cross left the conference in 1970 to play a more rounded schedule in ECAC 2 play and after a year the three remaining ECAC teams became founding members of ECAC 3. Worcester Polytechnic Institute dropped its ice hockey program after 1972 and the conference was dissolved.

WCHL Tournament
The WCHL held a conference tournament each year of its existence.

Member schools

# enrollment in 2018† as of 2018

Membership timeline

See also
ECAC 2

References

External links

NCAA Division II conferences